The women's 50 metre backstroke competition at the 2010 Pan Pacific Swimming Championships took place on August 19 at the William Woollett Jr. Aquatics Center.  It was the first appearance of this event in the Pan Pacific Swimming Championships.

Records
Prior to this competition, the existing world record was as follows:

Results
All times are in minutes and seconds.

Heats
The first round was held on August 19, at 11:32.

B Final 
The B final was held on August 19, at 19:39.

A Final 
The A final was held on August 19, at 19:39.

References

2010 Pan Pacific Swimming Championships
2010 in women's swimming